Vladimír Kučera (29 September 1942 – 25 May 2007) was a Czechoslovak boxer. He competed at the 1964 Summer Olympics and the 1968 Summer Olympics. At the 1968 Summer Olympics, he lost to Peter Tiepold of East Germany.

References

External links
 

1942 births
2007 deaths
Czech male boxers
Czechoslovak male boxers
Olympic boxers of Czechoslovakia
Boxers at the 1964 Summer Olympics
Boxers at the 1968 Summer Olympics
Sportspeople from Přerov
Light-welterweight boxers